Antigua and Barbuda competed at the 2017 World Championships in Athletics in London, United Kingdom, 4–13 August 2017. The Caribbean nation was represented by five male athletes due to compete in three events.

Cejhae Greene advanced through the semifinals of the 100 metres but he sustained an injury and failed to advance to the final. Chavaughn Walsh contested the preliminary rounds of the same event and was one of the 14 athletes to advance to the heats stage. However, he also sustained an injury and was forced to withdraw. A third athlete, Richard Richardson, sustained a wound on his shin and had to get five or six stitches. As a result of these injuries, head coach Carl Casey announced that the team would not be starting in the 4 × 100 metres relay.

Results

Men
Track and road events

References

Nations at the 2017 World Championships in Athletics
World Championships in Athletics
Antigua and Barbuda at the World Championships in Athletics